24th National Board of Review Awards
December 29, 1952
The 24th National Board of Review Awards were announced on December 29, 1952.

Top Ten Films 
The Quiet Man
High Noon
Limelight
5 Fingers
The Snows of Kilimanjaro
The Thief
The Bad and the Beautiful
Singin' in the Rain
Above and Beyond
My Son John

Top Foreign Films 
Breaking the Sound Barrier
The Man in the White Suit
Forbidden Games
Beauty and the Devil
Ivory Hunter

Winners 
Best Film: The Quiet Man
Best Foreign Film: Breaking the Sound Barrier
Best Actor: Ralph Richardson (Breaking the Sound Barrier)
Best Actress: Shirley Booth (Come Back, Little Sheba)
Best Director: David Lean (Breaking the Sound Barrier)

External links 
National Board of Review of Motion Pictures :: Awards for 1952

1952
1952 film awards
1952 in American cinema